"Filling Up with Heaven" is a song by British synthpop group the Human League, released as the third and final single from their seventh full-length studio album, Octopus (1995). It was jointly written by lead singer Philip Oakey and Producer Ian Stanley (formerly of Tears for Fears). The song was released on 5 June 1995 in a variety of vinyl and CD single formats. These included various third-party remixes of "Filling Up With Heaven" and "John Cleese: is he Funny?", including mixes by Hardfloor.

After the success of the previous two singles it was expected to equal the chart position of "Tell Me When" and "One Man in My Heart". But unlike the two previous singles it was not play listed by BBC Radio 1 and received minimal national airplay, affecting sales. The single eventually peaked at number 36 in the UK singles chart, spending a total of two weeks in the charts.

Critical reception
In his weekly UK chart commentary, James Masterton wrote, "The latest single from Octopus sounds almost as if it could have come from their early 80s heyday, a loosely structured song, playing on the juxtaposition of Phil Oakey's voice with those of Joanne Catherall and Suzanne Sulley. Very new romantic and so somehow a bit dated, hence possibly this rather lowly chart entry." Pan-European magazine Music & Media commented, "Oakey and the girls seem to be on a trip through outer space. Bombarded with more bleeps than in Star Wars, in our control room on planet earth we can see that they're still into melodies." A reviewer from Music Week gave the song three out of five, describing it as a "strong" third single from the album, "if not a break from the successful formula."

Music video

The accompanying music video for "Filling Up with Heaven" was filmed on a low budget and in a minimalist studio (London's Limehouse Studios), unlike the other music videos for Octopus which were higher end. With rich saturated background colours. It features a series of sweeping steadicam shots of Philip Oakey, with a mainly seated Susan Ann Sulley and Joanne Catherall. It is the only one of the Human League's music videos which Susan Ann Sulley has a long blonde pony tail hairstyle, for the previous two she has short hair, suggesting that she had hair extensions for the video.

For the instrumental sections a continual sweeping loop of Neil Sutton playing keyboards is featured. Post production the video was intentionally stylized by deeply enriching the colours and reducing the pixel resolution, giving a digital smudge effect (as illustrated).

A licensing fee dispute between EastWest and Virgin Records would prevent the video from being featured on the 2003 Very Best of The Human League DVD. However, in 2016, a remastered version of the video was featured on a DVD included with the deluxe version of the box set A Very British Synthesizer Group.

Versions

CD 1 1995, East West (YZ944CD1)
"Filling Up with Heaven"
"Filling Up with Heaven" (Neil Mclellan Vocal Mix)
"John Cleese; Is He Funny?" (ULA Remix)
"John Cleese; Is He Funny?" (Self Preservation Society House Mix)

CD 2 1995, East West (YZ944CD2)
"Filling Up with Heaven" (Hardfloor Vocal Remix)
"Filling Dub with Heaven" (Hardfloor Remix)
"Filling Up with Heaven" (Neil Mclellan Club Mix)
"Filling Up with Heaven" (ULA Remix)

Charts

References

External links
http://www.the-black-hit-of-space.dk/filling_up_with_heaven.htm

The Human League songs
1995 singles
1995 songs
Songs written by Philip Oakey
Songs written by Ian Stanley
Song recordings produced by Ian Stanley